Pro-Active South London (P-ASL) is a partnership of organisations with a common interest in developing sport and physical activity in the London boroughs of Bromley, Croydon, Kingston upon Thames, Merton, Richmond-upon-Thames, Sutton and also Wandsworth. Established in May 2006 as one of five sub-regional sport and physical activity partnerships in London and funded by the London Regional Sports Board.

Their vision is 'creating an active south London through sport and physical activity'

Their aim is 'to develop and enhance existing relationships and to establish new partnerships and networks, using sport and physical activity as the catalyst, to bring about positive social and economic well-being of local communities'.

Their key measures are 'to increase participation in sport and physical activity by 1% year on year and to widen access to under-represented groups'.

References

External links
Organisation website

Sports organisations in London